The 1954 Round Australia Trial, officially the Redex Trial was the second running of the Round Australia Trial. The route was truly "round (mainland) Australia", beginning in Sydney on 3 July 1954, passing through Brisbane, Rockhampton, Mackay, Townsville, Mount Isa, Darwin, Broome, Meekatharra, Madura, Adelaide and Melbourne, finishing at Moore Park on 20 July. 

246 cars took part and 127 finished within the times allowed, though many doggedly completed the course in the following week. One forced to drop out was the celebrated radio personality Jack Davey. The winner was a Ford 1948 V8, an ex-taxi dubbed the "Grey Ghost", driven by John Eric "Gelignite Jack" Murray (1907–1983) and navigated by the unrelated Bill Murray, losing no points on the trip. It was on this trial that Murray gained his nickname, from his occasional celebratory detonation of sticks of explosive, a custom that delighted some and infuriated others. "Secret" intermediate checkpoints were an innovation this year in an attempt to curb speeding.

Results

References

Rally competitions in Australia
Round Australia Trial